David Cullen (born December 30, 1976) is a Canadian former professional ice hockey defenceman. He attended Medaille College between 2010 and 2011, earning a master's degree in Education.

Playing career
Cullen played 16 games in the National Hockey League for the Phoenix Coyotes who signed him as an undrafted free-agent in 1999, scoring no points and collecting 6 penalty minutes.  He mainly played for the Coyotes' AHL affiliate the Springfield Falcons.

On January 4, 2002, Cullen was traded to the Minnesota Wild for Sébastien Bordeleau and played 3 games for the Wild scoring no points and no penalty minutes as he spent most of his time again in the AHL, this time with the Houston Aeros.  After 2 seasons in the Wild organization, he spent a further 3 seasons in the AHL with the Rochester Americans before moving to Europe in 2006, playing in Germany's Deutsche Eishockey Liga for the DEG Metro Stars, and in August 2007 he signed with the Swedish team Färjestads BK. But only after four months with Färjestad he and the club decided to terminate the contract and Cullen left the team. Cullen spent the rest of the year with the Syracuse Crunch of the AHL.

On July 6, 2008, Cullen signed a contract with Austrian team, Graz 99ers.

Awards and honors

Career statistics

Regular season and playoffs

References

External links

1976 births
Living people
Canadian ice hockey defencemen
DEG Metro Stars players
Färjestad BK players
Graz 99ers players
Houston Aeros (1994–2013) players
Sportspeople from St. Catharines
Maine Black Bears men's ice hockey players
Minnesota Wild players
Phoenix Coyotes players
Rochester Americans players
Springfield Falcons players
Syracuse Crunch players
Undrafted National Hockey League players
Ice hockey people from Ontario
Canadian expatriate ice hockey players in Austria
Canadian expatriate ice hockey players in Germany
Canadian expatriate ice hockey players in Sweden
AHCA Division I men's ice hockey All-Americans
NCAA men's ice hockey national champions